The following is a list of the chairs of the Federal Trade Commission.

Chairs selected by the chairs

Chairs designated by the president

References

Federal Trade Commission